Giławy  is a village in the administrative district of Gmina Purda, within Olsztyn County, Warmian-Masurian Voivodeship, in northern Poland. It is located in Warmia. The village has now a population of 540.

Before 1772 the area was part of Kingdom of Poland, 1772–1871 Prussia, 1871–1945 Germany, and again Poland since 1945. Despite being under German rule, a Polish school existed in the village before World War II.

The historic church of St. John the Baptist and a historical Warmian wayside shrine are located in Giławy.

References

Villages in Olsztyn County